The following is a timeline of the history of the city of Nanjing, Jiangsu Province, China.

Prior to 3rd century

 7000 BCE - Beiyinyang Neolithic people active.
 472 BCE - Castle built near Yuhuatai by Yue (state).

3rd-12th centuries

 229 CE - City becomes capital of Wu Kingdom.
 258 CE - Imperial University founded.
 313 - City renamed "Jiankang."
 317 - Capital of Eastern Jin Dynasty relocated to Jiankang.
 420 - City becomes capital of the Liu Song Dynasty.
 479 - City becomes capital of the Southern Qi Dynasty.
 502 - City becomes capital of the Liang dynasty.
 557 - City becomes capital of the Chen Dynasty.
 937 - Nan Tang in power.
 1168 - Jiangnan Examination Hall built.

14th century

 1367 - Construction of Ming Palace begun, completed in 1368.
 1368 - City becomes capital of Ming Dynasty, renamed Yingtian.
 1373 - Hongwu Emperor substantially expands Ming Palace compound, completed in 1375.
 1381 - Imperial University campus relocated to Xuanwu Lake.
 1382 - Drum Tower built.
 1386 - City Wall of Nanjing and Jubao Gate constructed.

15th-18th centuries

 1408 - Yongle Encyclopedia written.
 1421 - Capital of Ming Dynasty relocated from Nanjing to Beijing.
 1430 - Porcelain Tower of Nanjing built.
 1441 - 1441 Yangtze flood.
 1645 - Qing conquest of Nanjing; Nanzhili reorganized as Jiangnan, later divided into Jiangsu and Anhui
 1657 - City besieged by forces of Koxinga.
 1723 - Viceroy of Liangjiang residence relocated to Nanjing.

19th century
 1842
 British in power.
 29 August: City hosts signing of Treaty of Nanking.
 1853 - Taiping conquest of Nanjing in the First Battle of Nanjing.
 1856 - Second Battle of Nanjing.
 1858 - City designated a treaty port under the Treaties of Tianjin.
 1864 - Third Battle of Nanking.
 1870 - Chaotian Palace and Presidential Palace built.
 1890 - Naval college opens.
 1899 - Foreign trade begins.

20th century

 1902 - Sanjiang Normal College (later renamed Nanjing Normal University) founded.
 1907 - Jiangnan Library opens.
 1909 - Shanghai-Nanjing railroad opens.
 1910
 Nanyang industrial exposition.
 Population: 140,000 (approximate).
 1911
 10 November: City besieged by Manchu forces.
 2 December: Rebels take city.
 1921 - Population: 380,000.
 1927
 March: Nanking Incident.
 Nanjing Special (No.1) Popular Library founded.
 1928
 Central Guoshu Institute established.
 Liu Chi-wen becomes mayor.
 1929 - Sun Yat-sen Mausoleum built.
 1930 - Wei Tao-ming becomes mayor.
 1931 - City becomes capital of the Republic of China.
 1935 - Nanjing–Tongling railway opens.
 1936 - Jiangsu Art Gallery founded.
 1937
 Nanking Safety Zone set up.
 9 December: Battle of Nanking begins.
 12 December: USS Panay incident.
 13 December: Japanese forces take city.
 Nanking Massacre.
 1940
 City becomes capital of the Reorganized National Government of China.
 Cai Pei becomes mayor.
 1941 - Zhou Xuechang becomes mayor.
 1949 - 23 April: People's Liberation Army takes city.
 1952 - Nanjing College of Aviation Industry and Wutaishan Sports Center founded.
 1953 - Nanjing University of Science and Technology founded.
 1957 - Population: 1,419,000.
 1958 - Taiping Kingdom History Museum active.
 1968
 Nanjing Yangtze River Bridge constructed.
 Nanjing Railway Station opens.
 1988
 December: Nanjing anti-African protests.
 Nanjing High-tech Industrial Development Zone established.
 1994 - Jiangsu Sainty Football Club formed.
 1995 - City administration re-organized.
 1996 - Jiangsu Dragons basketball team formed.
 1997 - Lukou Airport opens.
 2000 - Jiangning District becomes part of Nanjing municipality.

21st century

 2001 - Second Nanjing Yangtze River Bridge constructed.
 2002
 Jiangpu and Liuhe districts become part of Nanjing municipality.
 Luo Zhijun becomes mayor.
 2004 - Longtan Containers Port Area opens.
 2005
 Third Nanjing Yangtze Bridge and Nanjing Olympic Sports Center opens.
 Nanjing Metro and Nanjing–Qidong Railway begins operating.
 10th National Games of China held.
 2008
 Hefei–Nanjing Passenger Railway begins operating.
 World Urban Forum held.
 2009 - Zifeng Tower built.
 2010
 28 July: Chemical plant explosion.
 Nanjing Dashengguan Yangtze River Bridge built.
 2013 - Air pollution in Nanjing reaches annual mean of 72 PM2.5 and 137 PM10, much higher than recommended.

See also
 Nanjing history
 List of Nanjing art groups
 Population of Nanking in December of 1937
 Urbanization in China

References

This article incorporates information from the Chinese Wikipedia.

Bibliography

Published in the 14th-19th centuries
 
  
 
 
 

Published in the 20th century
 
 
 
 
 
 

Published in the 21st century

External links

 Items related to Nanjing, various dates (via Digital Public Library of America).
 Items related to Nanking, various dates (via Europeana).

 
Nanjing
Nanjing
nanjing